Ganghwa Dolmens Gymnasium is an indoor arena in Incheon, South Korea. It has hosted numerous international tournaments such as the taekwondo and wushu events of the 2014 Asian Games.

References

Sports venues in Incheon
Indoor arenas in South Korea
Buildings and structures in Incheon
Venues of the 2014 Asian Games